| tries = {{#expr:
 9 + 7 + 7 + 8 + 11
 + 6 + 6 + 3 + 7 + 10
 + 5 + 5 + 2 + 2 + 4
 + 3 + 5 + 12 + 15 + 8
 + 5 + 5 + 9 + 14 + 12 
 + 6 + 7 + 7 + 9 + 15
 + 6 + 7 + 9 + 7 + 6
 + 9 + 10 + 9 + 5 + 10 
 + 9 + 3 + 4 + 6 + 8 
 + 4 + 10 + 9 + 5
 + 5 + 7 + 9 + 8 + 8
 + 4 + 5 + 6 
 + 6 + 7 + 8  
 + 8 + 8
 + 7 + 4 + 9 + 7 + 7 
 + 4 + 10 + 8 + 8 + 6
 + 5 + 6 + 5 + 7 
 + 3 + 7 + 12 + 7
 +3 + 8 + 11 + 5 + 9
 + 2 + 4 + 2 + 3 + 9 
 + 11 + 6 + 5 + 5 + 10
 + 13 + 5
 + 6 + 4 + 6 + 10 + 5 
 + 9 + 16 + 12
  + 9 + 10
 + 8 + 12 + 5
}}
| top point scorer   = 150 – James Williams (Hartpury)
| top try scorer     = 17 – Mark Bright (Richmond)Eoghan Clarke (Jersey Reds)
| prevseason         = 2020–21
| nextseason         = 2022–23
|teams=11}}

The 2021–22 RFU Championship was the thirteenth season of the RFU Championship, the professional second tier of rugby union in England. It featured ten English teams and one from Jersey. Saracens are the reigning champions and were promoted to the Premiership.

Structure
In a return to the structure used prior to 2020–21, the eleven teams played each of the other teams twice. There was no end of season play-off and as no team met the minimum standards criteria, no team was promoted to Premiership Rugby. For the second consecutive year no team was relegated from the league.

RFU funding
For the second year in a row each club will receive approximately £161,500 in funding from the RFU as part of the reduction of funding introduced ahead of the 2016–17 season. Last season, following news of the funding change, several clubs announced a switch to a semi-professional business model.

Teams
Ten of the eleven teams played in last season's competition. Saracens having beaten Ealing Trailfinders in the 2020–21 final were promoted into Premiership Rugby with no team relegated. London Scottish returned to the league following a one-year hiatus due to the costs associated with the COVID-19 pandemic. They intended to leave the Athletic Ground ahead of this season, however it was later confirmed they would remain at the Athletic Ground.

Table

Fixtures & results
Fixtures for the season were announced by the RFU on 22 July 2021. The season commenced on 17 September and the final round of matches are due to take place in mid-March.

Round 1

Round 2

Round 3

Round 4

Round 5

Round 6

Round 7

Round 8

Round 9

Round 10

Round 11

Round 12

Round 13

Round 14

Round 15

Round 16

Round 17

Rounds 10, 12 & 14 (rescheduled matches)

Round 18

Round 19

Round 20

Rounds 13 & 17 (rescheduled matches)

Round 21

Rescheduled matches

Rescheduled matches

Rescheduled matches

Notes

References

 
RFU Championship
RFU Championship seasons